The 1948–49 season was Stoke City's 42nd season in the Football League and the 28th in the First Division.

It was again a disappointing season for Stoke as a number of players started voicing their displeasure at manager Bob McGrory's strict discipline. A number of players handed in transfer requests as discomfort began to affect the club. Results on the pitch were inconsistent and a mid table finish of 11th was the final outcome.

Season review

League
A strange feeling of disharmony set in at the Victoria Ground prior to the start of the 1948–49 season and Stoke received a number of transfer requests from players on the slightest whim. The previous season's main signings Jimmy McAlinden and Tommy Kiernan both departed after just a year with the club losing around £2,000 on the pair. The only other player whose wish to leave was accepted was Bert Mitchell. The 4 December 1948 was Stoke's red letter day as they fielded a team against Blackpool that cost a mere £10 and with all of them from the Stoke-on-Trent area. The only blotch on the claim however is that Frank Mountford was born in Doncaster but he moved to Stoke when he was about three years old.

A mid table position of 11th was all that Stoke could have expected from an inconsistent season with 16 wins and 17 defeats. One key point during the season was manager Bob McGrory's decision to employ Frank Bowyer as an out-and-out centre forward and he scored 21 goals. Surprisingly, when the campaign ended Bowyer asked for a transfer which was accepted but he soon had a change of heart and would remain at the club until 1960.

FA Cup
Stoke beat Swindon Town 3–1 in the third round before being drawn against Stanley Matthews' Blackpool. Stoke overcame the "Tangerines" 1–0 in a replay. Around 46,738 fans assembled to watch Stoke take on Third Division Hull City but much to the shock of the Stoke supporters, Hull won 2–0 on an awful Victoria Ground pitch.

Final league table

Results

Stoke's score comes first

Legend

Football League First Division

FA Cup

Squad statistics

References

Stoke City F.C. seasons
Stoke City